TechRadar is an online publication owned by Future and focused on technology. It has editorial teams in the US, UK and Australia and provides news and reviews of tech products and gadgets. It was launched in 2008 and expanded to the US in January 2012, holding a splashy launch party at the club Tao in The Venetian Hotel during the CES show in 2013. It further expanded to Australia in October of 2012. It was the largest consumer technology, news and review site from the UK as of 2013.

TechRadar also has licensed versions in Italy, Spain, Germany, France, Norway, Sweden, Denmark, Finland, the Netherlands and Belgium. The Indian and Middle East versions of the site closed in October 2022. It also has two spin-off sites, TechRadar Pro and TechRadar Gaming.

TechRadar is owned by Future plc, the sixth-largest publisher in the United Kingdom. In Q4 2017, TechRadar entered the top 100 of Similarweb's US Media Publications Rankings as the 93rd biggest media site in the United States.

Editors 
Lance Ulanoff is the current US Editor in Chief and Marc McLaren is the UK Editor in Chief. Previous editors include Paul Douglas, Gareth Beavis, Darren Murph, Patrick Goss and Marc Chacksfield.

TechRadar Pro 
TechRadar Pro, an arm of the main site, is a b2b-focused property with an emphasis on small business. The subbrand "acts as a complementary source of information targeted specifically at businesses and decision makers," the company says. A related property, 5GRadar.com, is focused on the mobile industry.

TechRadar Gaming 
The newest brand extension – TechRadar Gaming, or TRG – was launched 17 December 2021 and aims to "sit at the intersection of hardware and gaming, leveraging strengths of existing brands to bring the best experience to gaming audience." The Editor in Chief is Julian Benson. The company described a related hiring spree for the site as "the biggest investment in gaming in a decade."

References

External links

American technology news websites
Computer magazines published in the United Kingdom
British news websites
Online magazines published in the United Kingdom
Computing websites
Magazines established in 2008